Conrad R. Lozano (born March 21, 1951, in Los Angeles, California) is an American musician and the bass player for Los Lobos.

References 

1951 births
Living people
American rock bass guitarists
Los Lobos members
Guitarists from Los Angeles
American male bass guitarists
20th-century American bass guitarists
20th-century American male musicians